The Battle of Segré was a battle between the forces of Conan II, Duke of Brittany, and an alliance of the rebel Rivallon I of Dol, the Angevin Empire, and the Duchy of Normandy.

During Conan's 1066 campaign against Anjou, he took Segré.

References

1060s in France
Segre
Conflicts in 1066
1066 in Europe
Military history of Brittany